James or Jim Stanley may refer to:

 James Stanley, 7th Earl of Derby (1607–1651), Lord of Mann and Earl of Derby
 James Stanley, 10th Earl of Derby (1664–1736), British peer and politician
 James Stanley (American football) (born 1978), American football player and coach
 James Stanley (bishop) (c. 1465–1515), Bishop of Ely 1506–1515
 James Stanley (writer), American soap opera actor, writer and producer
 James Lee Stanley (born 1946), American folk singer-songwriter
 James Smith-Stanley, Lord Strange (1716–1771), Chancellor of the Duchy of Lancaster
 Jim Stanley (American football) (1935–2012), American football player and coach
 Jim Stanley (baseball) (1888–1947), baseball shortstop